Achik is a surname. Notable people with the surname include:

Abdelhak Achik (born 1959), Moroccan boxer
Mohammed Achik (born 1965), Moroccan boxer